William Price Craighill (July 1, 1833 – January 18, 1909) was born in Charles Town, Virginia (now West Virginia), son of William Nathaniel Craighill & Sarah Elizabeth Brown. He was an author, Union Army officer in the American Civil War, and later served as Chief of Engineers.

Army Corps of Engineers
A classmate of Philip Sheridan, John Bell Hood, and James B. McPherson, Craighill ranked second in the United States Military Academy class of 1853 and was commissioned in the United States Army Corps of Engineers. After working on several Atlantic coast forts including Fort Delaware, he taught engineering at the Military Academy from 1859 to 1862.

Civil War
As a Virginian who stood for the Union Army, Craighill was division and department engineer during the American Civil War and worked on the defenses of Pittsburgh, Baltimore, San Francisco, and New York City.

Craighill wrote the 1862 Army Officer's Pocket Companion: A Manual for Staff Officers in the Field, one of the first Army field manuals.  He also translated Antoine-Henri Jomini's the Art of War from French, with George H. Mendell in 1862.

Post war
After the Civil War, Craighill superintended construction of defenses at Baltimore Harbor and Hampton Roads. He headed the Engineer Office in Baltimore from 1870 to 1895, overseeing river and harbor work in Maryland and parts of Virginia and North Carolina. When the Corps began to build locks and dams on the Kanawha River in West Virginia in 1875, Craighill assumed charge there as well. He completed the first of the moveable wicket dams built in the United States, after visiting France to study their use. He became the Corps' first Southeast Division Engineer.  He was a member of the Board of Engineers from 1886 to 1889. He was appointed Chief of Engineers by President Grover Cleveland in 1895.

He retired two years later and died in Charles Town, West Virginia.

References

This article contains public domain text from

External links
 
 
 Example of Movable Wicket Dam
 

1833 births
1909 deaths
19th-century American male writers
American military writers
Burials at Zion Episcopal Churchyard (Charles Town, West Virginia)
Engineers from West Virginia
Military personnel from West Virginia
People from Charles Town, West Virginia
People of West Virginia in the American Civil War
Union Army officers
United States Army Corps of Engineers Chiefs of Engineers
United States Army generals
United States Military Academy alumni
United States Military Academy faculty
Writers from West Virginia